The individual eventing at the 1972 Summer Olympics took place between 29 August and 1 September. The event was open to men and women. The competition included three segments: dressage, cross-country, and show-jumping. Penalties from each were summed to give a total score.

Results

References

Equestrian at the 1972 Summer Olympics